The Stony Brook Seawolves football team is the collegiate football team that represents Stony Brook University at the NCAA Division I level. The program participates in the Division I Football Championship Subdivision and currently competes in the twelve-member Colonial Athletic Association. The program plays its home games at Kenneth P. LaValle Stadium in Stony Brook, New York.

Stony Brook first fielded a varsity team at the Division III level in 1984 and rose to Division II in 1996. In 1999, the Seawolves became a Division I program, joining the Northeast Conference without offering scholarships until 2006. After a year of FCS independence, Stony Brook joined the Big South Conference and fully transitioned into a 63-scholarship program. In the summer of 2012, the program announced its admission into the Colonial Athletic Association.

Seasons

References

Stony Brook

Stony Brook Seawolves football seasons